Thomas Bryan (born 1866) was a Welsh international footballer of the 19th century. He played twice for Wales in the 1885-86 British Home Championship, scoring one goal.

References

External links
 

1866 births
Wales international footballers
Year of death missing
Welsh footballers
Association football forwards
Oswestry Town F.C. players